Vein is a remix album by Foetus, released on October 22, 2007 by Ectopic Ents. It contains remixes of songs from the studio album Love, including a b-side from the (not adam) EP.

Track listing

Personnel 
Adapted from the Vein liner notes.
 J. G. Thirlwell (as Foetus) – vocals, instruments, producer, recording, design
 Heung-Heung Chin – art direction
 Fred Kevorkian – mastering

Release history

References

External links
 Vein at foetus.org

2007 remix albums
Albums produced by JG Thirlwell
Foetus (band) albums